Bishop of (the) West(ern) (Region) may refer to:

 Bishop of the Western Region, an assistant bishop in the Anglican Diocese of Sydney
 Bishop of the Western Region, an assistant bishop in the Anglican Diocese of Brisbane
 Bishop of the Western Region, an assistant bishop in the Anglican Diocese of Melbourne